The 2020 FA Community Shield (also known as The FA Community Shield supported by McDonald's for sponsorship reasons) was the 98th FA Community Shield, an annual football match played between the winners of the previous season's Premier League, Liverpool, and the previous season's FA Cup, Arsenal, with the latter winning on penalties after a 1–1 draw. This was the fourth Charity Shield/Community Shield contested between the two clubs: Liverpool won in 1979 and 1989, while Arsenal were victorious in 2002.

The match was televised live on BT Sport 1, BT Sport Extra 1 and BT Sport Ultimate, with highlights shown later on Match of the Day on BBC One. Radio commentary was provided by Sam Matterface and Trevor Sinclair on Talksport. The game was played behind closed doors on 29 August 2020 at Wembley Stadium and followed the Women's Community Shield match at the same venue, thus forming the first Community Shield double-header.

Background
Arsenal won their 14th FA Cup title after beating Chelsea 2–1 in the final.

Liverpool won their first Premier League title since the league's formation in 1992, after rivals Manchester City lost 1–2 to Chelsea at Stamford Bridge on 25 June 2020.

Match

Summary
In the 12th minute, Aubameyang put Arsenal into the lead, receiving the ball on the left he cut in and curled a left-footed shot from just inside the penalty area into the right corner of the net past the diving Alisson.  Minamino made it 1-1 in the 73rd minute with a side-footed finish to the right from six yards out after the ball broke to him in the penalty area off Cedric.
The game went to a penalty shoot-out with Liverpool's Rhian Brewster the only player to miss his penalty when he struck the bar. Aubameyang scored the decisive final penalty for Arsenal, shooting to the right corner to win the match 5-4 on penalties.

Details

Notes

References

FA Community Shield
Community Shield
Charity Shield 2020
Charity Shield 2020
Community Shield
Events at Wembley Stadium
Community Shield
Fa Community Shield 2020